(Japanese: 太鼓の達人, Taiko no Tatsujin, lit. "Master of the drums") is a series of games created by Namco. In the games, players simulate playing a taiko drum in time with music. The series has released games for the arcade and for console and mobile platforms including PlayStation 2, Advanced Pico Beena, PlayStation Portable, Nintendo DS, Wii, Nintendo 3DS, Wii U, PlayStation Vita, PlayStation 4, Nintendo Switch, Xbox One, Xbox Series X/S, Microsoft Windows, iOS, Android and Japanese feature phones.

While the series is mainly designed for use within Japan, there are also localized versions for other regions, including English, Chinese and Korean-language versions.

Gameplay

Objective 
The main objective of Taiko no Tatsujin games is to hit a simulated Taiko drum following a chosen piece of music, corresponding to  scrolling from the right.

Controls 
Arcade releases are equipped with simulated Taiko, which can register hits when played with drum sticks (bachi).

Console versions mainly use buttons to play, while certain devices can support additional methods of input:
 A virtual Taiko drum is provided on devices with touchscreens (DS, 3DS, Wii U, iPod touch, smartphone, Nintendo Switch), played with either styluses or fingers.
 Dedicated peripherals simulating real drums can be purchased additionally for PS2, Wii, Wii U, PS4 or Nintendo Switch releases. Such a peripheral is included with the physical North American PlayStation 2 and European Nintendo Switch versions.

Notes
The variety of notes in the game consists mainly of red and blue markers. The red  note requires a hit on the face of the drum, and the blue  note requires a hit on the rim.

Other notes require quick consecutive hits on the drum. Types of such notes includes the yellow bar, the balloon note (called a burst note in Taiko: Drum Master) and the Kusudama ball (or the yam on older releases since PS2 Godaime, or the Mallet note in Drum Session! and Drum ‛n’ Fun!).

Unlike other rhythm games such as Guitar Hero, the drum is an addition to the songs and does not limit an instrument being played whenever the notes are not hit, nor does it simulate an off-key sound when missed as the game allows the players to freely hit the drum wherever they want, so long as it isn't close to a note that could result in a penalty.

Difficulty

Inner notecharts
Certain songs also have extra  in addition to the four standard levels.  These are intended to be alternative takes on the regular set. Although not a main objective, most inner note charts are made more difficult than regular note charts. This later changed to being exclusive to the Oni/Extreme difficulty only.

Some inner note charts work by changing to an alternative version of the song, or, exclusively in arcades, switching to a completely different song. As of the third-generation in 2011, these became separate songs.

Notechart branching 
Some songs can feature  in certain difficulty levels.

Gameplay options
Various aspects of the game can be changed to the player's liking:
 Players can choose an alternate instrument or sound to play, instead of the classic Taiko drum.
 Players can apply modifiers to change aspects of gameplay, like increased note speeds, reversed notecharts (red and blue notes interchanged) or randomized notecharts.
 In console releases, players can choose to have the notechart played automatically and correctly.
 In console releases, players can choose to have the song end early as soon as they miss one note.

Releases

Taiko no Tatsujin: Tatakon de Dodon ga Don
 is the first official home console release in the franchise, it was released on the PlayStation 2 on October 24, 2002, in Japan. Tatakon de Dodon ga Don features 29 songs selected from first three arcade versions of Taiko no Tatsujin released (such as "Marionette" by Boøwy, "Traveling" by Hikaru Utada, "Pieces of a Dream" by Chemistry, and "Mr. Moonlight (Ai no Big Band)" by Morning Musume), Tatakon de Dodon ga Don also features new original songs exclusive for the PlayStation 2 version of the game (such as "Stepping Wind" from Klonoa 2: Lunatea's Veil).

Taiko: Drum Master

Taiko: Drum Master is the first official North American release in the franchise, exclusively released for the PlayStation 2 on October 26, 2004, in North America and March 17, 2005, in Japan. Instead of Japanese pop and anime music, Taiko: Drum Master uses English-language pop music by artists including Queen and Madonna, and Western and Japanese animation theme songs from Dragon Ball Z, a Japanese anime that has been dubbed in English, and Jimmy Neutron: Boy Genius.

Taiko no Tatsujin 13

 is the thirteenth arcade release of the series, with service commencing December 17, 2009. Taiko no Tatsujin 13 was used to hold the Japan-wide tournament  in early 2010.

Taiko no Tatsujin 14
 is the fourteenth arcade release of the series. With more than 150 playable songs, 14 inherits many features from previous releases. For a limited time, 14 participated as part of a collaboration with McDonald's. As part of the franchise's 10th anniversary celebration, an upgrade patch was made available for 14, adding five extra songs to the track listing.

Taiko no Tatsujin Plus
 also stylized as Taiko no Tatsujin +, is a video game application exclusively for iOS devices, released on May 28, 2014, in Japan. Plus is free to download but charges for purchasing additional music packs. In June 2015, Plus introduces the  service, allowing unlimited downloads of designated songs within a set time for a fee. Plus is chiefly controlled with a simulated drum surface on the device's touchscreen, but also supports Roland Corporation's V-Drums electronic drum sets with subsequent updates.

In addition to typical Taiko no Tatsujin gameplay, Plus also includes the  feature, where in-game points can be exchanged for rolls of lucky draw for randomly drawn prizes.

Taiko no Tatsujin (2011)
 is the fifteenth arcade release of the series. This release is significantly different from previous arcade releases, allowing players to store play data with Bandai Namco's Banapassport card, customizing player characters and by-player difficulty settings. The game can also receive online updates to add playable songs and features. Initially released exclusively in Japan, the cabinet has been released since January 2014 in Southeast Asian regions including Taiwan, Hong Kong, Malaysia and Thailand.

Since its initial release in 2011, the game has received one or two major upgrades each year. Each release usually adds many new songs at once, implements modes exclusive to that release, as well as introduce new costume options and challenges in Ranking Dojo Mode.

Wadaiko Master 
In May 2014, a number of Taiko no Tatsujin cabinets seemingly based on Momoiro Ver. were found in arcades in Brazil under the name of Wadaiko Master. These cabinets were translated into Portuguese and featured a significantly reduced song list, only containing 32 tracks including three Brazilian Music tracks exclusive to this edition. Wadaiko Master is offline-only, lacking network features such as Banapassport support and software updates present in other releases.

Wadaiko Master is the only instance of Taiko no Tatsujin being officially released in arcades outside of Asia.

Taiko no Tatsujin: Nijiiro Ver.

Arcade operators upgraded this title from the 2011 game by purchasing a hardware renovation kit, which includes a brand new arcade board based on System BNA1, a 120 Hz monitor, and a QR code reader.

Nijiiro Ver. features new elements such as the  obtained by clearing a song with the highest possible level of accuracy. The song settings menu has been updated to allow for more options, including more control over the notes' playback speed. The default scoring system has been changed significantly, as it no longer awards bonuses for long combos and instead focused on accuracy. The "Classical" and "Variety" song genres have been removed, with their songs being assigned to other categories. There is also a vast amount of graphical updates, notably with the inclusion of horizontal text on the song select menu, similar to Drum 'n' Fun. On a livestream at JAEPO 2020, Etou, the game's director, said that this is to prepare the game for "overseas players".

An international version of Nijiiro Ver. was released for Asia and Oceania in Spring 2021. The game has seen a limited release in Australian arcades in October 2022. This version is multilingual and is playable in English, Traditional Chinese or Korean. Special, regional songs exclusive to the international version are also included upon release.

In February 2023, Bandai Namco Amusement America introduced Nijiiro Ver. as a two-week location test in the United States at two arcades in Illinois.

Taiko no Tatsujin: Wii U Version
 is the first Taiko no Tatsujin game exclusively for the Wii U, released on November 21, 2013, in Japan only. The game was said to carry 70 songs, and features appearances of Golden Bomber and Super Mario Bros., and a collaboration campaign with Japanese idol group Momoiro Clover Z.

Wii U Version features the new gameplay mode  where multiple players alternately play a single song in a relay race-like fashion. The game also supports the Wii U GamePad with a touchscreen drum, and can be played with the GamePad alone without needing a television set.

Both free and paid downloadable content, including outfit items and additional playable songs, are available via the Nintendo eShop.

Taiko no Tatsujin: Rhythmic Adventure 1
The game includes a reported number of 60 songs, and guest appearance of Jibanyan from Yo-kai Watch, Airou from Monster Hunter 4, Funassyi and Kumamon.

Players engage in random encounter drum-playing battles and gather befriended enemies as team members, similarly as in Pokémon games with added rhythm game elements.

Both free and paid downloadable content, including additional quests for Space-time Adventure Mode, outfit items and additional playable songs, are available via the Nintendo eShop. Additional content can also be unlocked via scanning QR codes hosted at various other media and using Spot Access functionality at specific locations.

Rhythmic Adventure 1 was later localized into a Korean-language version and was released on August 27, 2015.

Taiko no Tatsujin: Tokumori!
 is the second Taiko no Tatsujin game exclusively for the Wii U, released on November 20, 2014, in Japan only. The game boasts a collection of 100 playable songs, and features appearances of guest characters such as Funassyi, Kumamon and Hatsune Miku.

Tokumori features two new modes:  a capsule toy set-up for unlocking unlockable content, and  a quiz mini-game that players would have to guess the intro of a song. Baton Touch Play Mode returns from Wii U Version.

Both free and paid downloadable content, including outfit items and additional playable songs, are available via the Nintendo eShop.

The game was removed from the Nintendo eshop.

Taiko no Tatsujin: V Version
 is a Taiko no Tatsujin game exclusively for the PlayStation Vita, released on July 9, 2015. The game includes more than 80 playable songs, with a focus on anime, Vocaloid and video game music.

The game also features the practice mode  that can fast forward, rewind and change speed.

A traditional Chinese version, with translated Chinese menu and dialogue text but retaining Japanese voice acting, will be released on the same release date in Taiwan and Hong Kong. This version is expected to feature Asia-exclusive playable songs, to be continually made available after release.

Taiko no Tatsujin: Atsumete ☆ Tomodachi Daisakusen!
 is the third Taiko no Tatsujin game exclusively for the Wii U, released on November 26, 2015, in Japan. Coinciding with the series' 15th Anniversary, the game includes an original 15th Anniversary short animation produced in collaboration with Studio Ghibli, and the first printing of the bundle version that includes additional 15th Anniversary branded goods.

The game features the brand new  mode, with Katsu-chan befriending animals to become the most popular person in the neighborhood. Other modes from past Wii U titles also make a return.

Taiko no Tatsujin: Rhythmic Adventure 2
The game features over 70 songs and introduces a new Mystery Adventure mode, which adds an RPG adventure to the game. In this mode, Don-chan and Katsu-chan explore Mystery Spots around the world. As the players advance through the story, the player fights in battles and allies with characters. A party can have up to eight characters.

Taiko no Tatsujin: Drum Session! 
Together with Drum 'n' Fun!, it is the first game of the series to be officially localized overseas in North America for over a decade, as well as the very first official European and Australian release from the series overall. The game is digital-exclusive for the NA, EU and AU markets, as opposed to both physical and digital for Japan and Asia markets. The game has the Friend Session Mode that lets players play against the online play data of other players, and the Guest Session Mode where players can challenge characters from other franchises.

Taiko no Tatsujin: Drum 'n' Fun!

The game was released in Japan, Hong Kong, Taiwan and South Korea on July 19, 2018, and in Southeast Asia on August 9. It was released in the US, Europe and Australia on November 2. Together with the first PS4 Taiko game, it is the first game of the series to be officially localized overseas in North America for over a decade, as well as the very first official European and Australian release from the series overall. The game is digital-exclusive for the North America region, but available in both physical and digital in Europe as well as the bundle that also packages the Tatacon drum controller with the game. It makes use of the motion controls of the console's Joy-Con controllers to simulate the use of drumsticks. The game also features exclusive songs from Super Mario Odyssey, Pac-Man Championship Edition 2, and Splatoon 2.

Taiko no Tatsujin: Rhythmic Adventure Pack
Mystery Adventure), bundled into one game and was released on the Nintendo Switch on 26 November 2020 in Japan and Asian countries and 3 December in Europe and North America. Rhythmic Adventure Pack is the first Taiko no Tatsujin game to feature a story mode translated into English. In addition to the two RPG modes, Taiko Mode was also included and featured 6 new songs not included in the original releases. The DLC songs from the original games are not included in the game. Rhythmic Adventure Pack is available physically in Japan and Asia; however, only a digital version will be available in Europe and North America.

Taiko no Tatsujin: The Drum Master!
Taiko no Tatsujin: The Drum Master! is the first title available exclusively for Xbox One, Xbox Series X/S, and Microsoft Windows, initially offered as part of Xbox Game Pass and released worldwide on January 27, 2022. It contains over 70 songs and features local and online multiplayer modes. Paid downloadable songs are available for purchase in addition to the game's base song list.

The Drum Master! was removed from the Xbox Game Pass library in January 2023.

Taiko no Tatsujin: Rhythm Festival 
Taiko no Tatsujin: Rhythm Festival is an entry for the Nintendo Switch that was released on September 23, 2022.

In other media

Collaborations
Taiko no Tatsujin frequently hosts collaboration campaigns with other video game franchises and companies. Collaboration efforts include porting signature songs into Taiko no Tatsujin games, sometimes with special dancers and background designs. In return Taiko no Tatsujin elements are shown as guest appearances in other media. Notable entities collaborated with the series include:

 Ace Attorney
 Assassination Classroom
 Attack on Titan
 Chain Chronicle
 Deemo
 Doraemon
 Groove Coaster
 Hatsune Miku
 Hello Kitty
 The Idolmaster
 The Idolmaster Must Songs Presented by Taiko no Tatsujin
 Kamen Rider Ex-Aid
 Kamen Rider Ghost
 Kamen Rider Build
 Kamen Rider Zi-O
 Kirby
 The Legend of Heroes: Trails of Cold Steel
 Mario Kart Arcade GP DX
 maimai
 Monster Hunter 4 Ultimate
 Neon Genesis Evangelion
 One Piece
 Pokémon
 Puzzle & Dragons
 Sachiko Kobayashi
 Sound Voltex
 Splatoon
 Studio Ghibli
 Super Mario
 Tamagotchi
 Tekken 7
 Touhou Project
 Ultraman X
 Yakuza
 Ys I & II Chronicles
 Yo-kai Watch 2
 Yo-kai Watch 3

Spin-offs
From 2005, Kids Station broadcast 26 3-minute shorts of the Taiko no Tatsujin characters in clay anime.
A manga version of the series was also serialized in Comic Bom Bom.

Mini versions of the game appear in the Namco game Tales of the World: Narikiri Dungeon 3 when the main characters is equipped with a costume resembling a drum, and in the Nintendo DS game Nodame Cantabile.

Playable Taiko no Tatsujin machines also appear in Yakuza 5.

Reception

Taiko no Tatsujin games generally received favourable reviews from critics. Most published console and handheld releases received Famitsu Review Scores of over 30, out of a total of 40. Taiko: Drum Master attained a 77-point Metacritic score from 35 reviews.

As of 2019, the game series has sold over 10 million copies on consoles.

Notes

References

External links

 Official website (in Japanese)

ALL.Net games
Arcade video games
Bandai Namco Entertainment franchises
Drumming video games
Japan-exclusive video games
Mobile games
Music video games
Namco games
Nintendo DS games
Nintendo 3DS games
PlayStation 2 games
PlayStation Portable games
PlayStation 3 games
PlayStation Vita games
PlayStation Vita-only games
Rhythm games
Wii games
Wii U games
 
Video game franchises introduced in 2001
Video games developed in Japan
Japan Game Awards' Game of the Year winners